Chaswe Nsofwa (22 October 1978 – 29 August 2007) was a Zambian international footballer who played as a striker. He died during a training match in Be'er Sheva, Israel.

Career

 Hapoel Be'er Sheva	
During a trial in August 2007, Nsofwa scored two goals in two Toto Cup matches, prompting a signature. He was signed by Hapoel Be'er Sheva of the Israeli Liga Leumit (National League) though too late for the Israel Football Association to allow him to play in the club's first league match. After missing the first league round, he played his first match on 25 August 2007 against Hakoah Amidar Ramat Gan. His first start was a successful one as he scored two goals and received much praise from the local supporters.

International career
He was part of the Zambian African Nations Cup team in 2002. He also represented his country at the 1999 FIFA World Youth Cup in Nigeria.

Death
On 29 August 2007, Nsofwa suffered sudden heart failure during a training match against Maccabi Be'er Sheva at Vasermil Stadium. 40 minutes later, he was brought to Soroka Medical Center where he was declared dead on arrival.

He was buried on 6 September in his home country of Zambia at Lusaka's Old Leopards Hill cemetery. His funeral was attended by former president Frederick Chiluba as well as several members of the Zambian national squad. As a mark of respect, Hapoel Be'er Sheva have retired the number six shirt in his honour.

See also
List of footballers who died while playing

Honours

 Zanaco
 Premier League:
 Winners: 2002–2003
 Mosi Cup:
 Winners: 2002–2003

 Green Buffaloes
 Mosi Cup:
 Winners: 2004–2005

References

External links
 
 

1978 births
2007 deaths
Zambian footballers
Zambia international footballers
Zambian expatriate footballers
Zambian expatriate sportspeople in Malaysia
PFC Krylia Sovetov Samara players
Expatriate footballers in Russia
Expatriate footballers in Malaysia
Hapoel Be'er Sheva F.C. players
Expatriate footballers in Israel
Association football players who died while playing
Sport deaths in Israel
2002 African Cup of Nations players
Russian Premier League players
Liga Leumit players
Zanaco F.C. players
Association football forwards
Zambian expatriate sportspeople in Russia
Zambian expatriate sportspeople in Israel